Chernyshkovsky is an urban locality (a work settlement) and the administrative center of Chernyshkovsky District in Volgograd Oblast, Russia, located on the Tsimlya River. Population:

References

Urban-type settlements in Volgograd Oblast